Trücizna is the fourth studio album by the Polish black metal band Witchmaster. It was released on April 10, 2009, through Agonia Records.

Track list

Personnel

References

2009 albums
Witchmaster albums